Norra IP  was a football stadium in Sandviken, Sweden  and the former home stadium for the football team Sandvikens IF.

References 

Defunct football venues in Sweden